The National Cyclopaedia of American Biography is a multi-volume collection of biographical articles and portraits of Americans, published since the 1890s.  The primary method of data collection was by sending questionnaires to subjects or their relatives.  It has over 60,000 entries, in 63 volumes.  The entries are not credited. The overall editor was James Terry White. It is more comprehensive than the Dictionary of American Biography and the American National Biography, but less scholarly because it doesn't cite the original sources used for the information.

See also
 Appletons' Cyclopædia of American Biography

References

External links

 Hathi Trust. National Cyclopaedia of American Biography fulltext
 The National Cyclopaedia of American Biography By James Terry White, online at Google Books:
Volume 2, published 1895. John Adams is in Volume 2, page 1.
Volume 3, published 1893.
Volume 4, published 1897. Ulysses S. Grant is in Volume 4, page 1.
Volume 5, published 1894.
Volume 8, published 1900.
Volume 9, published 1899.
Volume 10, published 1909. William Mason is in Vol.10, page 368.
Volume 11, published 1901.
Volume 12, published 1904.
Volume 14 (Supplement 1), published 1910.

Other volumes are accessible from The Online Books Page

United States biographical dictionaries